William Duncan Buchanan (27 July 1911 – 1985) was a Scottish amateur football right half who made over 90 appearances in the Scottish League for Queen's Park. He represented Scotland at amateur level.

References

Scottish footballers
Scottish Football League players
Queen's Park F.C. players
Place of death missing
People from Stirling (council area)
Association football wing halves
1911 births
Scotland amateur international footballers
1985 deaths